BHEL Ranipur Legislative Assembly constituency is one of the seventy electoral Uttarakhand Legislative Assembly constituencies of Uttarakhand state in India. It includes Ranipur area of Haridwar District.

BHEL Ranipur Legislative Assembly constituency is a part of Haridwar (Lok Sabha constituency).

Election results

2022

See also
Haridwar (Lok Sabha constituency)

References

External link
  

Haridwar
Assembly constituencies of Uttarakhand
2002 establishments in Uttarakhand
Constituencies established in 2002